Glebovo is a rural locality in Pashkovsky Selsoviet Rural Settlement, Kursky District, Kursk Oblast, Russia. Population:

Geography 
The village is located on the Obmet River (a right tributary of the Tuskar in the basin of the Seym), 102 km from the Russia–Ukraine border, 6 km north of the district center – the town Kursk, 2 km from the selsoviet center – Chaplygina.

 Climate
Glebovo has a warm-summer humid continental climate (Dfb in the Köppen climate classification).

Transport 
Glebovo is located 6.5 km from the federal route  Crimea Highway (a part of the European route ), 6 km from the road of regional importance  (Kursk – Ponyri), 5.5 km from the road of intermunicipal significance  (Kursk – Iskra), 3 km from the road  (38N-379 – Chaplygina – Alyabyevo), on the road  (38N-381 – Glebovo – Denisovo), 6 km from the nearest railway halt Bukreyevka (railway line Oryol – Kursk).

The rural locality is situated 14 km from Kursk Vostochny Airport, 137 km from Belgorod International Airport and 209 km from Voronezh Peter the Great Airport.

References

Notes

Sources

Rural localities in Kursky District, Kursk Oblast